Foley Room is the sixth studio album by Brazilian electronic music producer Amon Tobin, released on March 5, 2007, through Ninja Tune. The album was supported by the "Bloodstone" single, which was released digitally on January 9, 2007, and physically on January 21.

Composition
The album was recorded in part at the Foley effects room at Ubisoft Montreal. In the past, Tobin had created music through the sampling of old vinyl records. However, Foley Room is a marked departure from his traditional technique. Inspired by the Foley rooms where sound effects are recorded for films, Tobin decided to record and work with original samples for the record. According to the Ninja Tune website, "Amon and a team of assistants headed out into the streets with high sensitivity microphones and recorded found sounds from tigers roaring to cats eating rats, neighbours singing in the bath to ants eating grass". Tobin also called upon The Kronos Quartet, Stefan Schneider and Sarah Pagé to record samples for the record.

Among the many field recordings captured by Tobin for the album include the sounds of wild animals, "roaring motorcycles, grinding chains, the crisp clashing of automated machinery, the delicate tiptoeing of ants, dripping water and clacking train tracks."

Release
The first single, "Bloodstone", was released digitally on January 9, 2007. The song was later released as a physical CD single on January 21 with the album track "Esther's" and unreleased track "Here Comes the Moon Man" also included on the disc. In promotion of the record, Ninja Tune released two YouTube "trailers". A DVD documentary detailing the album's recording process was also released with the album.

Track listing

Charts

References

2007 albums
Amon Tobin albums
Ninja Tune albums
Sound collage albums